Christiana Spens is a writer, academic and artist.

Biography
Christiana Spens grew up in Fife, Scotland and was educated at the University of Cambridge in Philosophy, followed by the University of St. Andrews for her master's degree and doctorate. She is the author of Shooting Hipsters: Rethinking Dissent in the Age of PR (Repeater Books, 2017) and The Portrayal and Punishment of Terrorists in Western Media (Palgrave Macmillan, 2019), several novels and a graphic novel. Her academic work looks at terrorism, ritual, visuality and neo-Orientalism. She has written for The Irish Times, Byline Times, Art Quarterly, Elephant Magazine, Prospect Magazine, Studio International and The Quietus on art, literature and politics. She is part of the Truth Tellers Collective, a group that analyses and creates artistic responses to political events, based at King's College London.

Publications
 The Socialite Manifesto, 2009
 Death of A Ladies' Man, 2013
 Shooting Hipsters : Rethinking Dissent in the Age of PR, 2016
 The Portrayal and Punishment of Terrorists in Western Media : Playing the Villain, 2019
 The Fear, 2023

References 

Living people
1988 births
Alumni of the University of St Andrews
Alumni of the University of Cambridge
People educated at Madras College
Scottish women writers
21st-century Scottish women writers